Amelia Osborne, Marchioness of Carmarthen, 12th Baroness Darcy de Knayth, 9th Baroness Conyers, 5th Countess of Mértola (née Darcy; 12 October 1754 – 27 January 1784), was a British peer and a Portuguese countess.

Life
She was the only surviving child of Robert Darcy, 4th Earl of Holderness, and his wife, the former Mary Doublet. Her portrait was painted in about 1764 by François-Hubert Drouais. On 29 November 1773, she married Francis Osborne, Marquess of Carmarthen, in London, and they had three children:
Lord George William Frederick Osborne (21 July 1775 – 10 July 1838), later 6th Duke of Leeds; married Lady Charlotte Townshend, daughter of the 1st Marquess Townshend, on 17 August 1797 and had issue.
Lady Mary Henrietta Juliana Osborne (7 September 1776 – 21 October 1862); married Thomas Pelham, 2nd Earl of Chichester (28 April 1756 – 4 July 1826) in 1801 and had issue.
Lord Francis Osborne (18 October 1777 – 15 February 1850), later 1st Baron Godolphin; married The Hon. Elizabeth Eden, third daughter of the 1st Baron Auckland, on 31 March 1800 and had issue.

In early 1777 Amelia's mother Lady Holderness broke off relations with her daughter after the Carmarthens gave shelter to Richard Glover (son of the poet), a friend of Lord Carmarthen, when he eloped with one of the daughters of Solomon Dayrolles.

On 16 May 1778, as the only surviving child of her father, Amelia succeeded de jure to the titles of 12th Baroness Darcy de Knayth and 9th Baroness Conyers in her own right, and to the Portuguese countship of Mértola. Her right to the baronies of Darcy de Knayth and Conyers was eventually confirmed in 1798, long after her death.

In December 1778 Lady Carmarthen's marriage ended when she ran off with Captain John "Mad Jack" Byron. Byron had been visiting her at home in Grosvenor Square when her husband was absent, and they had been having an affair. Lord and Lady Carmarthen were divorced on 31 May 1779. Almost immediately after the divorce, she married Byron. They had three children:

Sophia Georgina Byron (July 1779 – died aged two months; buried at Twickenham on 18 September 1779).
Unnamed son (died at birth, ca. 1780/81).
Augusta Maria Byron (26 January 1783 – 12 October 1851).

A year after the birth of the last child, Amelia died and the titles were inherited by her eldest son, George. By his second wife, her widower became the father of the poet, Lord Byron.

References

1754 births
1784 deaths
18th-century British people
18th-century British women
Amelia
Osborne, Amelia
Daughters of British earls
British courtesy marchionesses
Lord Byron
Darcy de Knayth, Amelia Osborne, 12th Baroness
Amelia
Barons Darcy de Knayth
Barons Conyers